Amblypneustes leucoglobus is a species of sea urchin of the family Temnopleuridae. Their armour is covered with spines. It came from the genus Amblypneustes and lives in the sea. Amblypneustes leucoglobus was first scientifically described in 1914 by Ludwig Döderlein.

See also 
Amblypneustes formosus
Amblypneustes grandis
Amblypneustes ovum

References 

Amblypneustes
Animals described in 1914
Taxa named by Ludwig Heinrich Philipp Döderlein